Gilbert Ojadi Aduche (born 29 September 1965) is a Nigerian weightlifter. He competed at the 1988 Summer Olympics and the 1992 Summer Olympics.

References

External links
 

1965 births
Living people
Nigerian male weightlifters
Olympic weightlifters of Nigeria
Weightlifters at the 1988 Summer Olympics
Weightlifters at the 1992 Summer Olympics
Place of birth missing (living people)
Commonwealth Games medallists in weightlifting
Weightlifters at the 1990 Commonwealth Games
Commonwealth Games silver medallists for Nigeria
Medallists at the 1990 Commonwealth Games